Axwar(r)bed ("stablemaster") was a Sasanian title which was held by officials in control of the royal stables.

Sources 

 
 

Sasanian palace offices
Sasanian court titles